The Bailang River Bridge Ferris Wheel is a centreless non-rotating Ferris wheel built on the  Bailang River Bridge that crosses the Bailing river in Weifang, Shandong, China.

Design
Comprising 4,600 tons of steel and a kite grid construction system, described as a 'dragon spine', the body of the Ferris wheel remains stationary while each of the 36 carriages takes 30 minutes to fully traverse its circumference. Each carriage can carry 10 passengers and has Wi-Fi and television sets.

References

Ferris wheels in China